Louis Head is a community in the Municipal District of Shelburne in the Canadian province of Nova Scotia on the Lighthouse Route.

References
 Louis Head on Destination Nova Scotia

External links
 

Communities in Shelburne County, Nova Scotia
General Service Areas in Nova Scotia